The Battle of Brest, also known as the Battle of Terespol, was a battle between Russian imperial forces and Polish rebels south-west of Brest (near the village of Terespol), present-day Belarus, on 19 September 1794. It was part of the Kościuszko Uprising.

The battle
Before 19 September, Polish rebels fortified themselves in the marshes near the town of Brest. At night (at 2 AM, according to one source), Alexander Suvorov moved his troops near the Polish positions, and attacked at dawn. The fighting lasted for six hours, often involving hand-to-hand combat, but the Russians finally managed to gain the upper hand, destroying the Polish force. 500 of Sierakowski's men were taken prisoner, and the fields all around Brest were covered with corpses. The Polish lost all of their 28 artillery pieces and two banners. According to Russian sources, Sierakowsky himself fled to Siedlce with a detachment of his cavalry corps. A Russian military report stated that losses on their side stood at 95 killed and 228 injured, however in reality it is estimated that around 1000 Russians were killed.

Aftermath
The Russian victory at Brest took a major hit on Polish morale. Tadeusz Kościuszko himself was distraught by the loss. In August, he announced at a meeting that by September, the Ottoman Empire would declare war on Russia and that "Suvorov, occupied by [them], could not be in Poland." Subsequently, there were rumors that a relatively low-ranking Cossack general named Suvorov, as opposed to the well-known one, was going to lead the Russian fight in Poland. After the Battle of Brest, however, it became clear which Suvorov was on the front lines.

Kościuszko's response
Kościuszko rushed to Siedlce to rally his troops and prevent the spread of panic. He explained the defeat at Brest as not the fault of the Polish commanders, but rather that the Russians simply had a numerical superiority. He also presented several of his commanders with new awards, with golden rings inscribed with the slogan, "The fatherland to its defender". Despite Kościuszko's efforts, Polish morale still suffered. This is evidenced by a report presented by Kościuszko, to the commanders of the Lithuanian army in Grodno:

Kościuszko found it necessary to remind his subordinates of their historical legacy:

Reaction in Russia
In Saint Petersburg, Suvorov's victory was very well received. Catherine the Great granted him an expensive diamond hat bow and three cannon captured from the Poles; Pyotr Rumyantsev thanked Suvorov and presented a most flattering evaluation of his efforts.

References

 Stanisław Herbst "Z dziejów wojskowych powstania kościuszkowskiego 1794 roku" Warszawa 1983. pages 365-77
 “Powstanie kościuszkowskie 1794 : dzieje militarne” pod red. T. Rawskiego, vol. II, Warszawa 1994

Kościuszko Uprising
Battles involving the Polish–Lithuanian Commonwealth
Brest (1794)
History of Brest, Belarus
Alexander Suvorov